Flipped is an American comedy series written by Steve Mallory and Damon Jones that debuted on Quibi on April 6, 2020. Flipped is a feature film broken into multiple chapters under 10 minutes in length, the first three of which premiered upon Quibi's launch.

Premise 
Two self-proclaimed home renovation experts, intent on basic cable fame, are kidnapped by drug cartel members and forced to renovate their homes. Olson says the series is inspired by Chip and Joanna Gaines.

Cast 
 Will Forte as Jann Melfi, Cricket's husband and a self-proclaimed artist who views himself as an intellectual, even if his on-camera commentaries don't always make sense.
 Kaitlin Olson as Cricket Melfi, Jann's wife and a woman who wants things done the right way or not at all.
 Arturo Castro as Diego, a Mexican sicario and gangster who works for Rumualdo Vasco, a powerful Mexican drug lord and cartel leader.
 Eva Longoria as Fidelia, Rumualdo's hot wife.
 Andy García as Rumualdo Vasco, a powerful Mexican drug lord, cartel leader and Diego's boss.
 Jerry O'Connell as Chazz Connelly, a co-host of "Pros and Connellys" and Tiffany's husband.
 Rebecca Romijn as Tiffany Connelly, a co-host of "Pros and Connellys" and Chazz's wife.

Episodes

Reception 
On Rotten Tomatoes, the series has a 71% rating with an average score of 7.25 out of 10 based on 24 reviews. The site's critical consensus read: "Flipped's formatting doesn't do it many favors, but Kaitlin Olson and Will Forte dig into their characters with such skill and delight that it's hard not to have a good time anyway."

Accolades

References

External links 
 
 

2020 American television series debuts
2020s American comedy television series
Quibi original programming
Television series by Funny or Die
American comedy web series
Works about Mexican drug cartels